Gadirtha is a genus of moths of the family Nolidae.

Species
Gadirtha fusca Pogue, 2014
Gadirtha impingens Walker, [1858]
Gadirtha inexacta Walker, [1858]
Gadirtha pulchra Butler, 1886

References

Nolidae
Noctuoidea genera